Herman Ngoudjo (born 25 June 1979) is a Cameroonian-Canadian former professional boxer who competed from 2003 to 2010, and challenged twice for the IBF junior-welterweight title in 2008 and 2009. As an amateur he represented Cameroon at the 2000 Olympics, reaching the opening round of the bantamweight bracket. Earlier he won a silver medal at the 1998 Commonwealth Games, also in the bantamweight division.

Professional career
Ngoudjo turned professional on November 22, 2003 in Montreal, Quebec, where he now resides.  He defeated Eloy Rojas on February 26, 2005 to win the NABF light welterweight title and Emanuel Augustus on February 25, 2006 to win the WBC International light welterweight title. On January 20, 2007, he lost a split decision to top ten pound-for-pound super-lightweight José Luis Castillo. Ngoudjo was considered a tune-up fight for Castillo and shocked the HBO audience by going the distance in a WBC light welterweight title eliminator. He defeated Randall Bailey in a split decision June 8 on ESPN to set up a fight for the IBF title.

On January 5, 2008 Ngoudjo was defeated by IBF light welterweight champion Paul Malignaggi by unanimous decision at the Bally's Hotel & Casino in Atlantic City, New Jersey.  It was a highly competitive bout.  Malignaggi controlled the fight early on, but in the 7th round Ngoudjo stunned the champ but was unable to capitalize.  During the remainder of the fight Ngoudjo continued to be the aggressor but the judges awarded the fight to Malignaggi by a wide decision.

On June 6, 2008, at Uniprix Stadium in Montreal, Quebec, Ngoudjo fought through a badly swollen left eye and managed a unanimous decision victory over former WBA light welterweight champion Souleymane M'baye. After Ngoudjo produced a stellar second round, he was faced with adversity the next round as his left eye quickly began to close. M'baye did his best to take advantage of Ngoudjo as he turned the fight into an inside battle. The ring doctor examined Ngoudjo at the beginning of the fifth round and proclaimed him fit to carry on. By the sixth round, Ngoudjo seemed in trouble as he was getting beaten up when on the inside and was getting picked off with relative ease when staying on the outside. M'baye seemed in control until the later rounds when Ngoudjo let his hands go to full effect. Ngoudjo won by scores of 117-111, 116-112, and 115-113.

Professional boxing record

References

External links

1979 births
Living people
Boxers at the 2000 Summer Olympics
Boxers at the 1998 Commonwealth Games
Commonwealth Games silver medallists for Cameroon
Cameroonian emigrants to Canada
Light-welterweight boxers
Olympic boxers of Cameroon
Sportspeople from Douala
Boxers from Montreal
Cameroonian male boxers
Commonwealth Games medallists in boxing
African Games bronze medalists for Cameroon
African Games medalists in boxing
Bantamweight boxers
Competitors at the 1999 All-Africa Games
Medallists at the 1998 Commonwealth Games